Shaqi Sulaiman (born 11 October 1998 in Singapore) is a Singaporean footballer.

References

Singaporean footballers
Association football defenders
1998 births
Living people
Balestier Khalsa FC players